La Cholla Airpark  is a private airpark located in Oro Valley, Pima County, Arizona, United States,  northwest of the central business district of Tucson. La Cholla Airpark was founded in 1972 and includes 122 homes and buildable lots in the foothills of the Tortolita Mountains.  A 4,500 foot air strip is situated at the center of the community.

Transient aircraft are permitted to utilize La Cholla Airpark and prior permission is required.  Insurance and flight information must be forwarded (by fax) to the airpark prior to arrival. La Cholla Airpark supports a website to serve airpark homeowners and transient aircraft.

Facilities and aircraft
La Cholla Airpark has two landing sites:
 Runway 1/19 measuring  asphalt
 Helipad measuring 

For the 12-month period ending December 31, 1999, the airport had 4,000 aircraft operations, an average of 10 per day, all of which were general aviation. As of January 15, 2009, 95 aircraft based at this airport: 95% single engine, 3% multi-engine and 2% helicopters.

References

External links 
 La Cholla Airpark (57AZ) at Arizona DOT airport directory
 

Residential airparks
Airports in Pima County, Arizona